The Tocumwal Football Netball Club, nicknamed the Bloods, is an Australian rules football and netball club that competes in the Murray Football Netball League. The club is based in the town of Tocumwal located in the Riverina district of New South Wales.

History
Tocumwal FC was established way back in 1891 and played its first recorded match in 1893 against Cobram. Tocumwal played the Murray Border Football Association from 1894 to 1896. They then joined the newly established Federal District Football Association in 1897 and play there until 1902.

Tocumwal played in seven consecutive Southern Riverina Football Association (SRFA) grand finals between 1922 and 1928, but unfortunately they only won the last won in 1928. 

Tocumwal Football Club was one of the foundation clubs and played in the Murray Football League from 1931 to 2013. They have won five senior premierships in over their time in the league, with 2009 being their most recent senior premiership in the league and to date.

After struggling in the Murray Football League, Tocumwal went and joined the Picola & District Football Netball League in 2014 where they have won two U/14's premierships in 2017 and 2022. They left the league after the 2022 season when the league disassociated with the AFL. They rejoined the Murray Football League for the 2023 season.

Tocumwal won the SRFA junior premiership in 1932, defeating Berrigan in the grand final.

Football competitions timeline 
Tocumwal Football Club have played in the following football competitions.
1894 to 1896: Murray Border Football Association
1897 to 1902: Federal District Football Association
1903 & 1904: Club in recess.
1905: Goulburn Valley Football Association
1906: Club pulled out of the GVFA, but did play in some friendly matches.
1907: Goulburn Valley Football Association
1908: Club pulled out of the GVFA, but did play in some friendly matches.
1909: Goulburn Valley Football Association
1910 & 1911: Southern Riverina Football Association
1912: Goulburn Valley Football Association
1913 & 1914: Southern Riverina Football Association
1915 – Club active, but did not join any football association due to World War I.
1916: Southern Riverina Football Association
1917: Club in recess.
1918 to 1930: Southern Riverina Football Association
1931 to 2013: Murray Football League
2014 to 2022: Picola & District Football League
2023 to present day: Murray Football Netball League

Football Premierships
Seniors
Murray Border Football Association
1895
Federal District Football Association
1898
Southern Riverina Football Association
1911, 1928
Murray Football League
1935, 1946, 1967, 1991, 2009

Football – Runners Up
Seniors
 Murray Border Football Association (1)
1896
 Southern Riverina Football Association (8)
1914, 1916, 1922, 1923, 1924, 1925, 1926, 1927.
Murray Football League (8)
1953, 1954, 1956, 1965, 1966, 1989, 1990, 2003.

VFL / AFL players
The following footballers played with Tocumwal prior to playing senior VFL / AFL football, with the year indicating their debut.
1928 – Clem Carr – Melbourne
1929 – Clarrie Hearn – Essendon. Hearn won the 1929 Stawell Gift too!
1934 – Fred De Abel – Hawthorn
1950 – Max Jeffers – Melbourne
1955 – Jeff Harris – Hawthorn
1955 – Allan Jeans – St. Kilda
1964 – Julian Vise – Collingwood
1984 – Ron Watt – Geelong
1984 – Tony Hughes – Sydney Swans
1987 – Leon Higgins – Sydney Swans & Hawthorn
1995 – Justin Crawford – Sydney Swans & Hawthorn
2013 – Matthew Taberner – Fremantle Dockers

References

External links
 
 Gameday website
 Club profile on AFL National
 Tocumwal FNC: 125th Anniversary
 Tocumwal FNC - Team of the Decade:2010 - 2019

Murray Football League clubs
1891 establishments in Australia
Australian rules football clubs established in 1891